The Outer Gate is a 1937 American film directed by actor/screenwriter Raymond Cannon. The screenplay concerns a man who organizes a revenge plot after being sent to prison for a crime he did not commit.

Plot summary
Bob Terry works for John Borden, and has eyes for his daughter, but after he's accused of stealing and is sent to prison for a crime he didn't commit, he organizes a revenge plot.

Cast 
Ralph Morgan as John Borden
Kay Linaker as Lois Borden
Ben Alexander as Bob Terry
Eddie Acuff as Todd
Charles Brokaw as Gangster John Carmody
unbilled players include Robert Cummings

External links 

1937 films
American black-and-white films
1937 romantic drama films
1937 crime drama films
Monogram Pictures films
American romantic drama films
American crime drama films
1930s English-language films
1930s American films